Love Joey is Joey Yung's first compilation, with 11 past hits and 5 new songs.

Track listing

Joey Yung albums
2001 compilation albums